Montreal Film Festival may refer to: 

Montreal International Film Festival (1960-1968)
Montreal World Film Festival (1977-2019)
Festival International de Films de Montréal (2005)